Jonathan Robert Williams (born August 29, 1983) is an American hurdler who has represented Belize internationally. He represented Belize at the 2008 Summer Olympics in Beijing. Williams attended the University of California, Los Angeles at the time.

On 1 July 2006, he changed affiliation from USA to Belize.

Personal bests
200 m: 21.34 s (wind: +0.6 m/s) –  Walnut, California, 10 March 2007
400 m: 47.62 s  –  Carson, California, 20 May 2007
800 m: 1:52.33 min  –  Walnut, California, 8 March 2008
110 m hurdles: 13.81 s (wind: +0.5 m/s) –  Los Angeles, California, 15 May 2005
400 m hurdles: 48.88 s –  San Salvador, 14 July 2007

Achievements

References

External links

Tilastopaja biography

1983 births
Living people
Belizean male hurdlers
University of California, Los Angeles alumni
UCLA Bruins men's track and field athletes
Olympic athletes of Belize
Athletes (track and field) at the 2008 Summer Olympics
Track and field athletes from Los Angeles
World Athletics Championships athletes for Belize
Pan American Games competitors for Belize
Athletes (track and field) at the 2007 Pan American Games
Competitors at the 2006 Central American and Caribbean Games
Competitors at the 2010 Central American and Caribbean Games
Central American Games gold medalists for Belize
Central American Games medalists in athletics
Central American Games silver medalists for Belize